The Rural Municipality of Three Lakes No. 400 is a rural municipality (RM) in the Canadian province of Saskatchewan within Census Division No. 15 and  Division No. 5.

History 
The RM of Three Lakes No. 400 incorporated as a rural municipality on January 1, 1913.

Geography

Communities and localities 
The following urban municipalities are surrounded by the RM.

Villages
 Middle Lake
 Pilger
 St. Benedict

The following urban communities are within in the RM.

Localities
 Reynaud
 Verndale

Demographics 

Attractions 
 Lenore Lake
 Lucien Lake Regional Park

Government 
The RM of Three Lakes No. 400 is governed by an elected municipal council and an appointed administrator that meets on the second Wednesday of every month. The reeve of the RM is Allen Baumann while its administrator is Tim Schmidt. The RM's office is located in Middle Lake.

Transportation 
 Saskatchewan Highway 20
 Saskatchewan Highway 773
 Saskatchewan Highway 777

See also 
List of rural municipalities in Saskatchewan

References 

Three Lakes
Division No. 15, Saskatchewan